King Gwrfoddw (died c. 619) was the King of Ergyng, a south-east Welsh kingdom of the early medieval period. He usurped the throne from Gwrgan ap Cynfyn.

Life
According to the Book of Llandaff, Gwrfoddw was victorious against the Anglo-Saxons and granted lands on the Wye to the Bishops of Ergyng in thanks. Dr. Wendy Davies calculates his reign to have taken place between about 615 and 619. His son, Erfig, was ousted upon his death in favour of King Cynfyn's son, Gwrgan Fawr.

Gwrbothu Hen
Scholars Rachel Bromwich and D. Simon Evans note that Gwrbothu Hen, a brother of King Arthur's mother who was killed by Twrch Trwyth in the 11th/12th century Welsh text Culhwch and Olwen, may refer to Gwrfoddw. Later legendary genealogies fix him and his brothers Llygadrudd Emys, Gweir Paladr Hir, and Gweir Gwrhyd Ennwir as sons of Amlawdd Wledig. The Arthurian legends are generally set in the late 5th or early 6th century, some time before Gwrfoddw, though medieval stories are not always precise with their chronology. Gwrbothu's epithet  ('the old' or 'the elder') is sometimes known to denote an ancestor or dynastic forebearer, which provides the possibility that Gwrbothu Hen was a forefather or predecessor of Gwrfoddw.

References

External links
 Britannia EBK Biographies: Gwrfoddw Hen One interpretation of the evidence

7th-century deaths
Monarchs of Ergyng
7th-century Welsh monarchs
Year of birth unknown